Small Potatoes is a British sitcom television series written by Richard Pinto and Sharat Sardana, first broadcast on Channel 4 from 1999 to 2001. Starring Tommy Tiernan, Sanjeev Bhaskar, Morgan Jones and Omid Djalili, it is set in East London and follows the life of a video rental shop employee, Ed Hewitt, and his friends.

Synopsis 
Underachieving twenty-something Ed Hewitt (Tommy Tiernan) has a media studies degree, but he works in a video shop in Leytonstone; however, he tries not to descend to the level of his layabout friends and fellow workers.

Episodes 
Small Potatoes ran for 13 episodes over two series.
 
Sick  (9 November 1999) 
Sexuality  (16 November 1999)
Staff (23 November 1999)
Scrubber (30 November 1999)
Secrets  (7 December 1999)
School (14 December 1999)
Alien  (31 July 2001)
Jimminy Critic  (7 August 2001)
Butch  (14 August 2001)
Blackout (21 August 2001)
Unbearable Whiteness of Being (29 August 2001)
Club (4 September 2001)
Sad Max (11 September 2001)

References

Channel 4 sitcoms
1990s British sitcoms
1999 British television series debuts
2000s British sitcoms
2001 British television series endings
Television shows set in London
Television series by Hat Trick Productions